Claude Desplan, a biologist originally trained in France, has been a Silver Professor in New York University’s Department of Biology since 1999. His research centers on understanding the development and functioning of the visual system that underlies color vision using the fruit fly Drosophila as a model organism.

Biography 

Born in Algeria, Desplan completed his undergraduate training at the Ecole Normale Supérieure in St. Cloud, France in 1975 and he received a Ph.D. at the Institut National de la Santé et de la Recherche Médicale (INSERM) in Paris in 1983. His thesis work, done under the guidance of Mohsen Moukhtar and Monique Thomasset, focused on calcium regulation.

As a postdoctoral fellow in the laboratory of Pat O’Farrell at the University of California, San Francisco, Desplan worked on the functional specificity of homeodomain proteins. He demonstrated that this conserved signature of many developmental genes is a DNA binding motif. In 1987, he joined the faculty of Rockefeller University and was named a Howard Hughes Medical Institute Assistant and Associate Investigator. There, he pursued structural and functional studies of the homeodomain and Paired domain DNA binding domains and investigated the evolution of axis formation in insects. He accepted a position as Professor at New York University in 1999.

Scientific work 

His laboratory has demonstrated the molecular mechanisms that pattern the fly color-sensing photoreceptor neurons and showed how stochastic decisions, a transcription factor network, and a tumor suppressor pathway contribute to the diversification of photoreceptors. It has also sought to understand how color information that arises within the retina is processed in the optic lobe of the Drosophila brain by investigating the development and function of this structure. His lab has shown that neuronal diversity in optic lobes is generated by the lineage of neural stem cells and by spatial input from patterning genes, and has provided a functional understanding of the neuronal and computational mechanisms that underlie color vision and motion detection (the ‘elementary motion detector’).
The Desplan laboratory also uses ‘evo-devo’ approaches to understand the evolution of patterning mechanisms in the early embryo and in the visual system using the wasp Nasonia  and the ant Harpegnathos as model systems. He contributed broadly to the understanding of how insect embryos pattern their antero-posterior axis through extensive rewiring of a network of genes that are otherwise evolutionarily conserved in Drosophila.
Desplan serves on multiple scientific advisory boards and in funding agencies. He is an elected member of the American Association for the Advancement of Science, an elected foreign member of EMBO, and an elected fellow of the New York Academy of Sciences.

Honors and awards
 2020 Awarded the Edwin Grant Conklin Medal by the Society for Developmental Biology
 2018 Elected to the National Academy of Sciences.

References

External links 
Official website at NYU
biographical sketch at NYU

Year of birth missing (living people)
Living people
French academics
French biologists
New York University faculty
Rockefeller University faculty